Antoine Georges Marie de Noailles, 9th Duke of Mouchy and Duke of Poix (born Paris, 7 September 1950), styled 13th Prince of Poix between 1950 and 2011, is a French nobleman.

Being the son of Philippe François Armand Marie de Noailles (1922–2011), 8th duke of Mouchy, and Diane Rose Anne Marie de Castellane, he was married on 20 June 1980, to Isabelle Frisch de Fels (born 1955).

They have three children :
 Mélanie Véronique Marie de Noailles (born Paris 11 September 1981)
 Charles Antoine Marie de Noailles, 14th Prince of Poix (born Paris 15 February 1984) 
 Adrien François Marie de Noailles (born Paris 10 May 1985) 

He is a descendant of the American heiress Mary Ray, Vicomtesse de Courval, born in New York in 1835 and descended from Thomas Cornell (settler).

References

1950 births
Living people
Princes of Poix
Dukes of Poix
Dukes of Mouchy
Antoine Georges Marie
French people of American descent
French people of Irish descent
Cornell family